Starobilsk is a city in Luhansk Oblast, Ukraine. It serves as the administrative center of Starobilsk Raion. The modern settlement was founded in 1686, and it was granted city status in 1938. The city has a population of  As a result of the 2022 Russian invasion of Ukraine, it has been under Russian occupation since March 2, 2022.

History

Prehistory 
Presumably, Starobilsk traces its heritage to the settlement of Bielska Sloboda which originally might have been named after Okolnichy Bogdan Belsky of Litvin Bielsky family who at that time was a subject of the Grand Duchy of Moscow.

Bielsky arrived at the banks of Siversky Donets to build a fortress at southern borders Tsare-Borisov (after Muscovite Tsar Boris Godunov) which was erected not far away in 1598–1600. In 1602 Godunov became suspicious of Belsky and order him to be arrested, stripped of any estates, and exiled to Siberia. After the death of Godunov Belsky was granted amnesty in 1605 due to the fact that his sister being a wife of the deceased Boris Godunov, Maria Skuratova-Belskaya, became a regent. Belsky was sent as a voivode to Kazan where in 1611 was killed by mob after refusing to pledge allegiance to False Dmitry II. Sloboda gradually became abandoned, while the fortress was destroyed in 1612 in one of Tatar raids.

Origin 
In 1686 the settlement was repopulated by servicemen of the Ostrohozk Sloboda Cossack Regiment who originally came from Poltava and Chernihiv regions and named their settlement after a town of Bilsk, Cossack Hetmanate that might have belonged to another Litvin who sided with Muscovites, Theodore Bielsky.

Being a runaway serfs, Tsarist government allowed them to settle in military frontier with the Crimean realm to carry out border guard functions. After the place became also populated with serfs from the central regions of the today's Russia, the Tsarist government took measures to find and return those fugitives. In 1701 the Ambassadorial Prikaz decided to conduct a population census in new settlements along Aidar and Siversky Donets. Most population avoided the census. According to data of stolnik M.Pushkin who in 1703 conducted population census in 34 settlements, in Bielsky was registered only 41 resident although in reality there were much more.

Trying to meet the demands of Russian landlords who repeatedly turned to the Tsar with complaints and requests to return fugitives, on 6 July 1707 Peter the Great issued an edict (ukase) about the search of "newly arrived from Rus all ranks of people". To the Don was sent a punitive detachment under command of colonel Prince Yuriy Dolgorukiy. He was charged to search for fugitives and "take them to those landowner from whom they ran away". That action led to the well known Bulavin Rebellion. Struggling with the rebellion, Tsarist troops eventually burnt the settlement to the ground.

In 1732 the settlement was repopulated again by peasants from around Ostrogozhsk (Ostrohozk) turning it into a sloboda Stara-Bila. Among the first of its new residents were again servicemen of the Ostrohozk Regiment led by sotnik I.Senelnykov. In 1782 Staro-Bila was assigned to the Derkul Horse Factory of Bilovodsk district (Voronezh Governorate). On Tsarist edict (ukase) from 1 May 1797 sloboda Staro-Bila was renamed into Starobelsk and became the administrative centre of Starobelsk uyezd in Kharkov Governorate of the Russian Empire.

Modern era 
Founded on October 12, 1851, Starobilsk "Joy of All Who Sorrows" Convent (Свято-Скорботний жіночий монастир) became a spiritual center for the region. After the Bolshevik revolution, the convent was restricted and, in April 1924, it was closed down. It remained empty until 1992, when the state returned it to the Orthodox Church. It was reconsecrated and opened in 1995.

The town was occupied by Austrian troops during the Central Powers' advance through Ukraine in spring 1918, but soon became a center of activity for the Revolutionary Insurrectionary Army of Ukraine or Anarchists. A photograph in the City Regional Museum (Старобільський краєзнавчий музей) shows Anarchist leader Nestor Makhno addressing the people of Starobilsk from a balcony on the main square in 1919.

The German Wehrmacht entered Starobilsk in late 1942 and evacuated nine months later, destroying much of the city but neglected to dynamite the milk factory. The Germans operated a Nazi prison in the city. The town was rebuilt around this factory, which in turn helped the region recover after the war.

The Prison for Polish POWs Officers 

During World War II, the old convent was the site of a Soviet prison camp for Polish prisoners of war (POWs), especially officers. 48 of them died in the camp and were buried in Chmirov cemetery. A plaque on the outside wall of the convent declares that 4,000 Polish prisoners were confined inside the convent and ultimately executed in 1940. These numbered among the officers were executed at the same time as the Katyn massacre, but in the Kharkiv NKVD building, and later buried in Pyatykhatky forest.

21st century 

During the first phase of the Russo-Ukrainian War many places in Luhansk Oblast were taken over by pro-Russian separatists; however, Starobilsk remained under Ukrainian control. The flag of the Luhansk People's Republic was raised over the Hotel Aidar on 17 June 2014, but swiftly removed. The city was occupied by a military presence for two years thereafter, during which time the statue of Lenin in Starobilsk city park was toppled by a tank.

In 2016, Lenin Street was renamed Monastery Street as it had been before the Bolshevik revolution.

Russian occupation 

On February 24, 2022, at the start of the 2022 Russian invasion of Ukraine, Russian Forces began an assault on Starobilsk, consisting of an unspecified number of Tanks, BMPS, and infantry.

On March 6, 2022, hundreds of locals gathered and took down the flag of the so-called Luhansk People's Republic, burning it and singing the Ukrainian national anthem. The pro-Russian forces dispersed the pro-Ukrainian meeting with shots in the air.

In early September 2022, Ukraine launched a major counteroffensive in the region. On 13 September, Ukrainian Governor of Luhansk Oblast, Serhiy Haidai, stated that Russian forces had fled Starobilsk adding that the city was "practically empty". As for December 2022, the latter claim was proven to be false, as the Ukrainian conteroffensive has stalled outside Svatove, around 60 KM from Starovilsk.

Gallery

International relations

Twin towns – Sister cities 
Starobilsk is twinned with:
  Lublin, Poland

Notable people 
 Nadiya Svitlychna, attended a school in the city
 Serhiy Zhadan, Ukrainian poet

Notes

References

External links 

 Website
 Butkov, V., Voitenko, O., Semenov, V., Kholdobin, I. Starobilsk. The history of cities and villages of the Ukrainian SSR.

Cities in Luhansk Oblast
Starobilsk Raion
Starobelsky Uyezd
Cities of district significance in Ukraine
Cities and towns built in the Sloboda Ukraine